Kokorin is a Russian surname that may refer to:

 Aleksandr Kokorin (born 1991), Russian footballer
 Anton Kokorin (born 1987), Russian sprint athlete
 Nikolay Kokorin (1889–1917), Russian military aviator

See also
 Kokořín
 Kokořín Castle

Russian-language surnames